The Carpenters' Very First Television Special was Richard and Karen Carpenter's first television special produced in the US, airing on December 8, 1976, and their second overall, following a special for BBC Television five years earlier.

The Carpenters performed a variety of sketches with guest stars Victor Borge and John Denver. It ended with a hits medley (which can be found without applause on the CD As Time Goes By).

The Skits
After Karen, Richard and the orchestra perform "We've Only Just Begun", they show a clip of Richard conducting the orchestra playing a different version of "We've Only Just Begun", with Karen's voice-over talking about how much Richard loves conducting orchestras. After the orchestra's finished, the Carpenters performed "Top of the World", which can be found on the VHS Yesterday Once More (repackaged as Gold: Greatest Hits on DVD in 2002).

On top of that, Richard and Karen perform a "Spike Jones and the City Slickers" style parody version of "(They Long to Be) Close to You", beginning with a harp introduction. The duo also performed "These Are the Jokes" on the same set as the one of "Top of the World", only with a black background instead of a blue background.

John Denver and Karen Carpenter did a duet together of a medley consisting of a cleaned up version of Robert Burns' "Comin' Through the Rye" and the Beach Boys' "Good Vibrations". The amazing thing about this medley is that in parts, Denver may be singing "Comin' Through the Rye", while Carpenter sings "Good Vibrations".

They did a skit of Karen's drumming talent as well. It begins with Richard and Karen talking about why Karen played the drums, and Karen says, "Why not!!" Then, they reminisce to the high school days, where classmate John Denver played the drums in the high school band, and Karen was stuck with the glockenspiel. They told how Karen obtained the drums, and fell in love with it immediately. After that scene, Karen plays a medley including "Strike Up the Band" and "'S Wonderful".

In the end, the band and the orchestra combined, and performed a Hits Medley to close the show.

References

External links 
 

The Carpenters
1976 television specials
1970s American television specials